Hanna Banaszak (born April 24, 1957) is a Polish jazz singer and poet. She was raised in Poznań.

Discography

Albums

Live albums

Compilation albums

Collaborative albums

Christmas albums

Video albums

Poetry
 Zamienię Samolubie na Szczodruchy, Oficyna Konfraterni Poetów, Cracow 2006,

References

1957 births
Living people
Musicians from Poznań
Polish women singers
Polish jazz singers
Polish poets